This is a list of Brazilian television related events from 1958.

Events
29 June - Brazil beat Sweden 5-2 to win the 1958 World Cup at Solna, Sweden.

Debuts

Television shows

Births
29 March - Pedro Bial, TV host, producer, director, writer & journalist

Deaths

See also
1958 in Brazil